Lake Mina is a lake in Douglas County, in the U.S. state of Minnesota.

Lake Mina was named for the mother of Frederick von Baumbach, an early settler and afterward Minnesota Secretary of State, and the latter for whom Baumbach Lake also was named.

See also
List of lakes in Minnesota

References

Lakes of Minnesota
Lakes of Douglas County, Minnesota